Le Sserafim (stylized in all caps) is a South Korean girl group formed by Source Music. The group consists of five members: Sakura, Kim Chae-won, Huh Yun-jin, Kazuha and Hong Eun-chae. Originally a six-member group, Kim Ga-ram left the group on July 20, 2022, after the termination of her exclusive contract. Le Sserafim debuted on May 2, 2022, with the release of their first extended play, Fearless.

Name
The group's name, Le Sserafim, is an anagram of the phrase "I'm Fearless".

History

2011–2021: Pre-debut activities 

Sakura made her acting debut in the movie Ano Hito Ano Hi in 2011. The same year, she joined the Japanese idol group HKT48 as a first generation trainee. She was promoted to a full member of HKT48 Team H in 2012 and transferred to HKT48 Team KIV in 2014. After being with the group for 10 years, Sakura officially graduated on June 27, 2021.

Sakura, Kim Chae-won and Huh Yun-jin participated in the reality competition series Produce 48 in 2018. Yunjin represented Pledis Entertainment, which at that time wasn't owned by Hybe Corporation, the parent company of Source Music before May 2020, while Chaewon represented Woollim Entertainment. After finishing in second and tenth place, respectively, Sakura and Chaewon were named to the final lineup of the show's project girl group Iz*One, promoting as members until its disbandment on April 29, 2021. Yunjin finished in 26th place and was eliminated in episode 11. 

Prior to joining the group, Kazuha was a professional ballerina, and after passing an audition, she was personally scouted by Big Hit Music founder Bang Si-hyuk during her studies at Dutch National Ballet Academy in the Netherlands. Kazuha also previously attended the Bolshoi Academy in Moscow, Russia and the Royal Ballet School in the United Kingdom.

Hong Eun-chae was a former student at Def Dance School for two years. She previously auditioned for JYP Entertainment and Pledis Entertainment before joining Source Music in 2021.

2022–present: Fearless, Kim Ga-ram's departure, and Antifragile 

On March 14, Source Music announced that they would launch a new girl group, with Sakura and Kim Chae-won set to be the first members. On March 21, Hybe confirmed the group would officially debut in May. The members were revealed in "The First Moment of Le Sserafim" teasers from April 4 to April 9 (in order: Sakura, Kim Ga-ram, Hong Eun-chae, Kim Chae-won, Kazuha, and Huh Yun-jin). On April 13, Source Music announced that Le Sserafim would release their debut extended play (EP) Fearless, on May 2. Pre-orders for the EP surpassed 270,000 copies in seven days and 380,000 copies in sixteen days.

Prior to the group's debut, Kim Ga-ram became a subject of controversy. She was accused of bullying other students at her middle school and engaging in underage smoking and drinking. Hybe Corporation denied the allegations, claiming that Kim was the victim, not the perpetrator, of bullying. They expressed that they would take legal action against those who spread false rumors, and Kim was not removed from the debut lineup.

On the day of its release, Fearless sold more than 175,000 copies. On May 10, eight days after their debut, the group earned their first music show win on SBS MTV's The Show. On May 20, Hybe Corporation and Source Music issued a joint statement regarding Kim Ga-ram's bullying allegations announcing that she would take a hiatus due to the pending investigations and that Le Sserafim would temporarily promote as a five-member group in the meantime. On July 20, Hybe Corporation and Source Music announced that Kim Ga-ram would depart from the group and that her contract had been terminated, with Le Sserafim continuing as a five-member group.

Le Sserafim released their second EP, Antifragile, on October 17. It marks their first release as five members following Kim Ga-ram's departure. The album reached number 14 on the Billboard 200, thus becoming the fastest K-pop female group to make a debut on the chart. On November 24, Hybe released a webtoon, titled Crimson Heart, inspired by the group's message to "advance without fear" through Webtoon.

On January 25, 2023, the group made their Japan debut, with the release of the Japanese version of "Fearless".

Members

Current
 Sakura
 Kim Chae-won – leader
 Huh Yun-jin
 Kazuha
 Hong Eun-chae

Former
 Kim Ga-ram

Timeline

Discography

Extended plays

Singles

Soundtrack appearances

Other charted songs

Videography

Music videos

Filmography

Web shows

Awards and nominations

Notes

References

External links

 

 
K-pop music groups
Musical groups established in 2022
South Korean girl groups
South Korean dance music groups
South Korean pop music groups
Musical groups from Seoul
Musical quintets
2022 establishments in South Korea
Hybe Corporation artists
Universal Music Japan artists